Khiara,  is a  local authority  located in the Western Beqaa District of the Beqaa Governorate in Lebanon.

History
In 1838, Eli Smith noted  el-Khiyarah's population as being Sunni Muslim.

References

Bibliography

External links
Khiara, localiban

Populated places in Western Beqaa District
Sunni Muslim communities in Lebanon